Fidel Odreman (9 May 1937 – 24 May 2017) was a Venezuelan boxer. He competed in the men's middleweight event at the 1960 Summer Olympics. At the 1960 Summer Olympics, he lost to Eddie Crook Jr. of the United States by a first-round knockout in the Round of 32.

References

External links
 

1937 births
2017 deaths
Venezuelan male boxers
Olympic boxers of Venezuela
Boxers at the 1960 Summer Olympics
Boxers at the 1963 Pan American Games
Pan American Games bronze medalists for Venezuela
Pan American Games medalists in boxing
People from Bolívar (state)
Middleweight boxers
Medalists at the 1963 Pan American Games